Eucithara typhonota is a small sea snail, a marine gastropod mollusk in the family Mangeliidae.

The holotype in the British Museum of Natural History is a juvenile form. This raises questions about the validity of this species.

Description
The length of the shell attains 8 mm, its diameter 1.5 mm.

The solid, gradate shell has an ovate shape. It is white with a smoky black spiral dorsal band, most conspicuous just behind the outer lip. It contains 8 whorls, impressed at the suture. The teleoconch shows a few rectilineal ribs, of which 12 in the body whorl. The aperture is narrow and oblong. The outer lip is simple (juvenile). The white columella is rather straight

Distribution
This marine species occurs in the Persian Gulf.

References

External links
  Tucker, J.K. 2004 Catalog of recent and fossil turrids (Mollusca: Gastropoda). Zootaxa 682:1-1295

typhonota
Gastropods described in 1901